Justice Bradbury may refer to:

Joseph Perry Bradbury, associate justice of the Ohio Supreme Court
Theophilus Bradbury, associate justice of the Massachusetts Supreme Judicial Court